The recurrent artery of Heubner, Heubner's artery or distal medial striate artery is an artery in the head. It is named after the German paediatrician Otto Heubner. It is a branch of the anterior cerebral artery. Its vascular territory is the anteromedial section of the caudate nucleus and the anterioinferior section of the internal capsule, as well as parts of the putamen and septal nuclei.

Structure 
The recurrent artery of Heubner is a branch of the anterior cerebral artery. It has a mean diameter of 0.8 mm, and a mean length of 2.4 cm. It is also known together with the lenticulostriate arteries as a striate artery. The lenticulostriate arteries arise from the middle cerebral artery.

Variation 
The recurrent artery of Heubner usually arises from the A1-A2 junction (between 44% and 62% of the time), but may arise from the proximal A2 segment (between 23% and 43%), or more rarely from the A1 segment (maybe up to 14% of the time).

The recurrent artery of Heubner has a very variable diameter and length. It varies in width from 0.2 mm to 1.3 mm. It varies in length between 0.9 cm and 3.8 cm.

Function 
The recurrent artery of Heubner supplies the anteromedial section of the caudate nucleus and the anterioinferior section of the internal capsule, as well as parts of the putamen and septal nuclei.

Clinical significance 
The recurrent artery of Heubner may become obstructed. This may cause infarction in those subcortical areas and thus hemiparesis. More proximal portions of the artery may cause spastic paraparesis and sensory loss contralateral to the lesioned side. Urinary incontinence and gait apraxia may also occur. Occlusive damage to Heubner's artery may also present with contralateral grip reflex issues, and symptoms of frontal lobe disorder. Contralateral gaze preference with or without transcortical motor aphasia may present in instances where the left hemisphere is affected in this type of occlusion.

History 
The recurrent artery of Heubner is named after the German paediatrician Otto Heubner.

References

Arteries of the head and neck
Cerebrum